Gurchan (also Romanized as Gūrchān; also known as Qūrchān) is a village in Khenejin Rural District, in the Central District of Komijan County, Markazi Province, Iran. At the 2006 census, its population was 466, in 115 families.   The inhabitants speak Tati

References 

Populated places in Komijan County